George Wight Ritchie (1889 – 6 December 1960) was an English professional footballer who played as a forward in the Football League for Brighton & Hove Albion and Reading.

Ritchie was born in 1889 in West Derby, Lancashire, which later became part of Liverpool. He was on the books of Preston North End without appearing in their league team, played Southern League football for Norwich City and Brighton & Hove Albion, guested for Liverpool during the First World War, and played non-league football for clubs including Rossendale United, Chester and Northfleet United. He died in Manchester in December 1960 at the age of 71.

Personal life
Ritchie served as a guardsman in the Grenadier Guards during the First World War.

References

1889 births
1960 deaths
People from West Derby
Footballers from Liverpool
English footballers
Association football forwards
Rossendale United F.C. players
Chester City F.C. players
Preston North End F.C. players
Norwich City F.C. players
Brighton & Hove Albion F.C. players
Reading F.C. players
Northfleet United F.C. players
Southern Football League players
English Football League players
Liverpool F.C. wartime guest players
Grenadier Guards soldiers
British Army personnel of World War I
Military personnel from Liverpool